State Route 20 (SR 20) is a  state highway roughly in the shape of a capital J rotated ninety degrees to the left, which travels through portions of Floyd, Bartow, Cherokee, Forsyth, Gwinnett, Walton, Rockdale, Newton, and Henry counties in the northwestern and north-central parts of the U.S. state of Georgia. Its counterclockwise, or western terminus is at the Alabama state line in Floyd County, and its clockwise, or eastern terminus occurs at its interchange with Lower Woolsey Road southwest of Hampton in Henry County south-southeast of the Atlanta Motor Speedway.

Route description

From the Alabama state line, SR 20 proceeds east through central Floyd County into the city of Rome, and is concurrent with US 27, SR 1, and SR 53 through downtown Rome. The highway leaves Rome to the east, concurrent with US 411, bisecting Floyd County, and then enters and bisects Bartow County, still concurrent with US 411 until just north of Cartersville (US 41 is briefly concurrent in Cartersville as well), after which SR 20 continues eastward on its own. The highway intersects I-75 north of Cartersville, and continues to head east, passing Lake Allatoona to its north, and entering Cherokee County. SR 20 heads east into central Cherokee County and through its county seat in Canton, and has a brief concurrency with I-575/SR 5, before continuing east into Forsyth County. In central Forsyth County, the highway dips southeast to pass to the south of Sawnee Mountain and heads through Cumming, crossing US 19 and SR 400, and heading on into Gwinnett County, passing to the south of Lake Lanier. SR 20 then turns south after an interchange with I-985/US 23/SR 365, crossing I-85 shortly thereafter. The road also provides access to SR 316, which leads to Athens.

SR 20 continues southward through Lawrenceville and heads through Loganville into Walton County and  paralleling the Gwinnett–Walton County line, before crossing into Rockdale County and meeting I-20/US 278/SR 12 in Conyers. Likely to help alleviate driver confusion due to two identically-numbered highways meeting, the highway is usually referred to at this point as SR 138, with which it travels concurrent through Conyers. SR 20 continues south and then southwest to the Henry County seat of McDonough, where it briefly travels concurrent with SR 81. SR 81 departs to the west after the highways cross I-75 at exit 218. The portion of SR 20 between the western end of the SR 81 concurrency and Lower Woolsey Road, the highway's clockwise/eastern terminus, was widened in the early 2000s from two lanes to four, including a new southern bypass of the city of Hampton, and more controlled access at US 19/US 41. The primary purpose of the widening has been to facilitate the flow of traffic to and from the Atlanta Motor Speedway located near the highway's eastern terminus.

Traffic
The Georgia Department of Transportation average annual daily traffic (AADT) numbers for the year 2011 show a variety of daily averages across SR 20. The traffic load on the highway starts at its lowest daily average load as the route starts into Floyd County, where numbers hover around 5,400 vehicles per day. These averages increase rapidly as the highway approaches Rome, going from around 12,000 vehicles to a peak of 38,000 vehicles in downtown Rome. As SR 20 becomes concurrent with US 27/SR 1, the numbers decrease to an average of 32,000, and then decrease more rapidly to around 15,000 as SR 20 heads east out of Rome. The vehicle load stays in that area all the way through Floyd County and into Bartow County, as the highway is the main west-to-east thoroughfare between Rome and Cartersville. In Cartersville, where the highway is concurrent with US 41, the vehicle count reaches a zenith of just over 41,000, but then drops off sharply as the highway heads into rural Cherokee County, dipping just below 10,000 before increasing again to near 24,000 vehicles per day as it approaches I-575/SR 5. On the portion of the highway that is concurrent with I-575/SR 5, the highway sees its maximum vehicle load of just over 54,000 vehicles, again dropping rapidly east of I-575/SR 5, going from around 24,000 down to 11,000, and further down to around 10,000 as the Forsyth County line is reached.

Numbers start to creep up again as the Forsyth county seat of Cumming approaches, going from 10,000 to over 22,000 vehicles, cresting at 37,000 vehicles south of Cumming, as the route feeds traffic onto US 19/SR 400 southbound into Atlanta. Averages stabilize around 20,000 vehicles per day as SR 20 heads into Gwinnett County, briefly cresting again at over 41,000 vehicles around I-985, and dipping to around 30,000 vehicles around I-85. South of Lawrenceville, numbers then start to decrease once more from around 22,000 down to 14,000 around Loganville, and dip down into average of just over 8,000 in rural Walton County. Until the highway reaches Conyers, average numbers see lows of 6,800 in Rockdale County, increasing again to just over 31,000 in and around Conyers and I-20. Rapidly decreasing once more to around 7,600 vehicles per day in Newton and northern Henry counties, another high is reached in the vicinity of I-75 with just over 28,000 vehicles per day, before the highway reaches its eastern terminus in Hampton with average traffic loads just over 12,000 vehicles per day.

National Highway System
The following portions of SR 20 are part of the National Highway System, a system of routes determined to be the most important for the nation's economy, mobility, and defense:
 From its western terminus at the Alabama state line to SR 124 in Lawrenceville
 From its intersection with Sigman Road NE to its interchange with I-20 in Conyers
 From I-75 in McDonough to its eastern terminus southwest of Hampton

History

1920s
The highway that would eventually become SR 20 was established at least as early as 1919 as the entire length of SR 4 from the Alabama state line to Cartersville, an unnumbered road from Cumming to Buford, part of SR 13 from Buford to Lawrenceville, and part of SR 45 from Lawrenceville to Loganville. By the end of 1921, SR 68 was established on the current path of SR 20 from Cumming to Buford. Also, SR 45 between Lawrenceville and Loganville was redesignated as part of SR 13. By the end of 1926, two segments had a "sand clay or top soil" surface: from the Alabama state line to just west of Rome and from Sugar Hill to Lawrenceville. The highway in the vicinity of Rome had a "completed hard surface". A portion of the highway from just east of Rome to a point northwest of Cartersville was under construction. In the northwestern part of Cartersville and farther to the west, a portion of the highway had a completed semi hard surface. Within three years, all of SR 4 was redesignated as part of SR 20, with US 41W designated on the Rome–Cartersville segment. US 19 was designated on the Buford–Lawrenceville segment. The portion of the highway at the Alabama state line had a completed semi hard surface. The portion of the highway just east of Rome had a completed hard surface. The highway was under construction northwest of Cartersville.

1930s
By the middle of 1930, SR 20 was established from SR 61 in Rydal to SR 5 in Canton. The entire Rome–Cartersville and Buford–Lawrenceville segments had a completed hard surface. Also, SR 53 was designated from the Alabama state line to Rome, farther to the north than SR 20. Later that year, the portion of SR 20 and SR 53 west of Rome were swapped. By the beginning of 1932, US 19 was shifted farther to the west and off of the current SR 20 between Buford and Lawrenceville; at the same time, US 23 was designated on this same segment. In January 1932, SR 20 was established from Canton to Cumming. SR 68, from Cumming to Buford, was decommissioned and redesignated as part of SR 20. Also, since SR 13 was shifted to a more western alignment, its segment from Buford to Lawrenceville was also redesignated as part of SR 20. A few months later, SR 20 was established from Loganville to Conyers. Nearly a year later, SR 20 was established from Conyers to McDonough. The next month, the western part of the segment from the Alabama state line to Rome was under construction. Later that year, SR 20 was designated along SR 61 from Cartersville to Rydal, with the entire length having a sand clay or top soil surface. Also, a portion of the highway east of Canton was under construction. Before the year ended, US 41W between Rome and Cartersville was redesignated as part of US 411, which was also designated along SR 20/SR 61 from Cartersville to Rydal. At this time, the Rockdale County portion of the segment between Loganville and Conyers was under construction. By the middle of 1935, the western half of the Canton–Cumming segment was under construction. By October of that year, a small portion east of Canton had a sand clay or top soil surface. At the end of the year, a small portion north-northeast of Cartersville, as well as a small portion north-northeast of Conyers, had a completed hard surface. Later in 1936, the central portion of the SR 20/SR 61 segment, from Cartersville to Rydal, had completed grading, but was not surfaced. A few months later, a small portion south-southwest of Rydal had a completed hard surface. The entire Forsyth County portion of the Canton–Cumming segment, except for the eastern end, was under construction. Also, the entire Gwinnett County portion of the Cumming–Buford segment had completed grading, but was not surfaced. By the middle of the year, the central portion of SR 20/SR 61, from Cartersville to Rydal, had a completed hard surface. Also, the eastern three-fourths of the Canton–Cumming segment was under construction. A few months later, the western third of this segment had a completed hard surface, while the eastern third of it had completed grading, but was not surfaced. The northern half of the segment between Lawrenceville and Loganville, and nearly the entire northern half of the segment between Conyers and McDonough, also had completed grading, but was not surfaced. About two years later, US 23 was shifted farther to the west and off of SR 20's path. Also, a small portion northeast of Buford had a sand clay or top soil surface. Before the year ended, about half of the total length of the segment from the Alabama state line and Rome had a completed hard surface.

1940s
Toward the end of 1940, the western portion of this segment, as well as the entire Rockdale County portion of the Conyers–McDonough segment, had a completed hard surface. Later that year, SR 20 Spur was built in the northern portion of Cartersville from US 41/US 411/SR 3/SR 20 to US 411/SR 20/SR 61. At this time, SR 113 was established from US 411/SR 20/SR 61 in the northern portion of Cartersville to SR 5 in the southern portion of Canton. In 1941, the western and eastern termini of SR 113 had completed grading, but were not surfaced. The next year, SR 113 was truncated to Cartersville, its former path was redesignated as part of SR 20. With the highway being shifted southward, its former path between Rydal and Canton became part of SR 140. In 1943, SR 20 Spur in the northern part of Cartersville was redesignated as part of the SR 20 mainline. By the end of 1946, three segments were hard surfaced: Alabama state line to Rome, Cumming to Buford, and Lawrenceville to Loganville. Between 1946 and the beginning of 1948, the Canton–Cumming segment, and a portion north-northeast of Conyers, were both hard surfaced. At this time SR 20 Spur was established in Loganville.

1950s
Before the third quarter of 1950 ended, a portion of the highway northeast of Cartersville was hard surfaced. By the end of 1951, the southern half of the segment from Loganville to Conyers, and a portion northeast of McDonough, had been hard surfaced. In 1952, an unnumbered road was built from SR 81 west-southwest of McDonough to US 19/US 41/SR 3 in Hampton. The next year, a small portion of SR 20 in the northern part of Cartersville, a portion of it west of Canton, and the entire Rockdale County portion were hard surfaced. At this time, SR 294N was built, with a hard surface, northeast of Cartersville. At this time, SR 20 Conn. was built, from SR 20 in Sugar Hill, to US 23/SR 13 south of Buford. In 1954, the entire Walton County portion of the highway was hard surfaced. SR 20 Conn. was redesignated as part of the SR 20 mainline. In 1955, it was reverted to being designated as SR 20 Conn., with the western part paved. A few years later, all portions of SR 20 that had been built were paved. At this time, SR 294 had been redesignated as the SR 294 mainline. By 1960, SR 20 was extended west-southwest from McDonough along SR 81, and then on a previously unnumbered road to US 19/US 41/SR 3 in Hampton. The entire length of this extension was paved.

1960s
Between 1960 and 1963, US 411 between Rome and Cartersville was shifted on a more southerly routing, concurrent with SR 344; SR 20 remained on the old alignment. By 1966, SR 294 had been reverted to being designated as SR 294N. SR 20 Conn. had been decommissioned and redesignated as the SR 20 mainline again. In 1966, SR 20 Spur was designated from SR 20 in Sugar Hill to SR 13 Spur in Buford.

Later years
The highway stayed about the same until 1977, when SR 344 was decommissioned. SR 20 was shifted onto US 411 between Rome and Cartersville. SR 20's old alignment was redesignated as part of SR 293. A few years later, SR 20 Spur in Loganville was decommissioned and redesignated as part of SR 81. A decade later, SR 20 Spur in Buford was also decommissioned. In the middle of the decade, SR 294N was decommissioned again and redesignated as SR 20 Spur. In the mid-2000s, SR 20 was extended to Lower Woolsey Road southwest of Hampton.

Major intersections

Cartersville spur route

State Route 20 Spur (SR 20 Spur) is a  spur route of SR 20. It travels from SR 20, just east of its interchange with Interstate 75 (I-75) north of Cartersville, south to Allatoona Dam. The highway, along with nearby Allatoona Dam road, formed the two segments of State Route 294.

By 1953, SR 20 Spur had been constructed and was signed as SR 294.

See also

References

External links

 

020
Transportation in Floyd County, Georgia
Transportation in Bartow County, Georgia
Transportation in Cherokee County, Georgia
Transportation in Forsyth County, Georgia
Transportation in Gwinnett County, Georgia
Transportation in Walton County, Georgia
Transportation in Rockdale County, Georgia
Transportation in Newton County, Georgia
Transportation in Henry County, Georgia